Edmund Woga CSsR (born 26 September 1950) is an Indonesian Roman Catholic bishop.

Biography
Woga was ordained a priest on 29 November 1977. In 1985 Woga took his vows and was professed a member of the Congregation of the Most Holy Redeemer. 

On 4 April 2009 it was announced that Woga had been chosen as the new bishop of the Diocese of  Weetebula, replacing Gerulfus Kherubim Pareira who had been installed as bishop of the Diocese of Maumere. On 16 July 2009 Woga was ordained bishop by Pareira was installed as the leader of the Diocese of Weetebula. As part of being ordained to the diocese on the island of Sumba, Woga vowed to help poor and marginalized people on the island, improve interfaith relations with Protestants and Muslims, as well as better faith formation for Catholic children.

Woga is also a writer, having published a book in January 2009 titled Misi, misiologi, dan evangelisasi di Indonesia, or Mission and evangelization of Catholic Church in Indonesia.

In September 2013 Woga was involved in a serious motorvehicle accident while traveling to a retreat in Nusa Dua, Bali. Woga's car was struck by a motorbike, and in the accident he suffered serious wounds and multiple fractures to his legs and thighs.

References 

1950 births
Living people
People from East Nusa Tenggara
21st-century Roman Catholic bishops in Indonesia
Redemptorist bishops
Roman Catholic writers